Ray Morton (born 19 June 1968) is a former international speedway rider from England.

Speedway career 
Morton reached the final of the British Speedway Championship on five occasions in 1995, 1996, 1998, 1999 and 2001. He rode in the top tier of British Speedway from 1985 to 2007, riding for various clubs.

References 

Living people
1968 births
British speedway riders
Exeter Falcons riders
Isle of Wight Islanders riders
King's Lynn Stars riders
Poole Pirates riders
Reading Racers riders
Rye House Rockets riders
Wimbledon Dons riders